Ugljan is a village in Preko municipality, Zadar County, Croatia. It is connected by the D110 highway. According to the 2011 census, it has a population of 1,278.

References

Populated places in Zadar County
Ugljan
Populated coastal places in Croatia